Michael Bille may refer to:
 Michael Bille (1680–1756), Danish naval officer
 Michael Johannes Petronius Bille (1769–1845), Danish naval officer